Louis Martinié is an author, "internationally known" percussionist, practitioner of a multitude of religions among them being New Orleans style Voodoo, and co-author of the book New Orleans VooDoo Tarot (1992), with Sallie Ann Glassman. 

He is a priest and drummer with the New Orleans Voodoo Spiritual Temple, and a primary drummer for the rituals of Priestess Miriam Chamani 

He is a leader of the band of drummers known as the Krewe of Nutria, who have drummed for the ritual shows of the New Orleans Historic Voodoo Museum. He is also the editor and a founder of Black Moon Publishing.

Bibliography

Books
 Agwe et Babylon: Cultus Marassa (1983)
 New Orleans VooDoo Tarot (1992) Louis Martinie' and Sallie Ann Glassman, Destiny Books  
 Voodoo at the Cafe Puce (2005) Louis Martinie' and Severina K.M. Singh. Logan, OH: Black Moon Publishing 
 Waters of Return: Aeonic VooDoo (1994) Louis Martinie', Black Moon Publishing 
 A Priest's Head, A Drummer's Hands (2010) Black Moon Publishing 
 Cincinnati Journal of Ceremonial Magick (1976) by Bate Cabal Associations Staff; Editor: Louis Martinie', Illustrated by Samekh 277, Black Moon Publishing,

Journals
 The Practitioner, The Priest, and The Professor: Perspectives on Self-Initiation in the American Neopagan Community (With Marty Laubach and Roselinda Clemons),  Journal for the Academic Study of Magic (Volume 4) 2007, edited by D. Green, S. Graf, A. Hale
 Archived articles by Louis Martinie'

Discography
  Festival and Ritual Drumming: Evoking the Sacred through Rhythms of the Spirit (1993) Mishlen Linden and Louis Martinie'. Destiny Recordings

Interviews
 Living the Wiccan Life, Episode 27, Pt. 1 - Louis Martinie' of the New Orleans Voodoo Spiritual Temple - Interview with Louis Martinie’ by Rev. Don Lewis of the Witch School at the WinterStar Symposium (2008) 
 Voodoo Drumming - Interview by Heather Kyle of Louis Martinie' and Utu (of Niagara Voodoo Shrine) and demonstration of the drumming for the "Order of Service" - recorded at the 2007 Starwood Festival: Pt. 1 , Pt. 2

References

 Maat Magick: A Guide to Self-Initiation by Nema - Weiser Books (November 1, 1995) , 
 The Evolution of Maat Magick: from Cornfields to Cyberspace by Nema (April 10, 2004) Lecture delivered at the Thelemic Conference held at Conway Hall, London.

External links
Voodoo Spiritual Temple
A Record of the Temple Martinie' posts about events in 1996 at New Orleans Voodoo Spiritual Temple
Black Moon Publishing & Bate Cabal

Living people
American occult writers
American Voodoo practitioners
Louisiana Voodoo
Year of birth missing (living people)